Thammy Brito de Miranda Silva (born September 3, 1982) is a Brazilian actor and reporter. He began his career as singer, model and dancer, professions before turning to acting and politics. He is the son of singer Gretchen and nephew of singer Sula Miranda.

Career
Miranda released his CD entitled Lindo Anjo in 2001, by record label MCK. He became famous with songs "Fala Pra Ele" (which was recorded by his mom in the same year) and the re-recording of the song "Mordida de Amor" by Banda Yahoo. He also succeeded with an original song called "Vivendo Assim" and "Vai" (written by his aunt). Before coming out as transgender, he was a dancer in his mom's presentations and was photographed naked for Sexy magazine.

Between 2007 and 2008, he acted in three pornographic films: Sádica, Thammy & Cia and A Stripper dos Seus Sonhos.

In 2012, Miranda was in the cast of Brazilian soap opera Salve Jorge, written by Glória Perez. In 2013, he did a test was hired to be a reporter in the reality Famoso Quem? of SBT.

In 2016, he was invited by writer Glória Perez to be cast in her new soap opera A Força do Querer, of Rede Globo, but refused due to his political campaign for City Councillor. In May 2017, Miranda debuted in theaters with the play T.R.A.N.S.: Terapia de Relacionamentos Amorosos Neuróticos Sexuais, which was cancelled in June, after divergencies with director Carlos Verahnnay.

In 2018, he was nominated by Isto É Gente magazine for the award of "Sexiest Man of the Year".

Politics
Miranda ran for a seat as City Councillor in the 2016 municipal election representing the Progressive Party (PP). He garnered 12,408, being the second most voted of his party, but couldn't be elect. In February 2019, he would assume a seat in the Municipal Chamber of São Paulo, after the election of Conte Lopes to the State Legislative Assembly, but a decision from the Superior Electoral Court made his swearing-in impossible. In 2020, Miranda was candidate for the Municipal Chamber by the Liberal Party and was elected, being one of the first transgender City Councillor of São Paulo, alongside Erika Hilton (PSOL).

Personal life
After coming out as lesbian in 2006, Miranda cut his long hair and began using male clothes. In a statement, his mother said that, since he was a child, Miranda had preferences for male clothes, and hated dolls and skirts. About his sexual orientation, Miranda said:

In the end of 2014, Miranda came out as transgender. In the same year, he began the hormone therapy for gender transition. In December 2014, Miranda submitted himself to the sex reassignment surgery and removed his breasts.

Miranda had many relationships. In 2006, after coming out, he dated model Patrícia Jorge, who was presented in TV show Boa Noite Brasil on 5 October 2006, and in the next year with porn actress Júlia Paes. On 3 September 2010, on his 29th birthday, he married in an intimate ceremony with Janaína Cinci, who he divorced from three months later. In December 2013, he began dating model Andressa Ferreira, marrying  her on 16 March 2018.

After an in vitro fertilisation, his wife Andressa got pregnant. She was inseminated with her own egg and the sperm from an anonymous donor. The child, Bento Ferreira de Miranda, was born from a caesarean section in Miami, on 8 January 2020.

Controversy
In August 2020, Thammy Miranda sued Pastor Silas Malafaia, accusing him of homophobia, after Malafaia urged consumers to boycott cosmetics company Natura which had hired Miranda for their Father's Day campaign.

Filmography

Television

Movies

Pornographic movies

Discography

References

External links
 
 

Living people
People from São Paulo
Transgender men
Brazilian LGBT rights activists
Liberal Party (Brazil, 2006) politicians
Actors from São Paulo (state)
Brazilian LGBT politicians
Brazilian pornographic film actors
Transgender politicians
1982 births
Brazilian transgender people